"Eye To Eye" is a 1985 song by American R&B singer Chaka Khan from her album I Feel For You. The song was a major hit in the United Kingdom where it peaked at number 16.

Remixes 
The song was remixed for Chaka Khan's album Life Is A Dance - The Remix Project, this remixed version was included on Khan's compilation album The Platinum Collection. The remix was done by British musician Paul Simpson.

Track listing

7" single

12" single

Charts

References

Chaka Khan songs
1984 songs
1985 singles
Warner Records singles
Songs written by Danny Sembello